Congo Jazz is a Looney Tunes cartoon starring Warner Bros.' first cartoon star, Bosko. The cartoon was released in September 1930. It was distributed by Warner Bros. and The Vitaphone Corporation. Congo Jazz was the first cartoon to feature Bosko's falsetto voice that he would use for the bulk of the series' run (the previous Bosko short, Sinkin' in the Bathtub, had used a derisive African-American dialect). It has the earliest instance of a "trombone gobble" in animation.

Plot 
As Bosko is hunting in the jungle, a tiger creeps up behind him and gives him a lick. Finding his gun useless, Bosko tries to flee. After being chased and having his body stretched and his head slapped off, Bosko pulls out a flute and begins playing music, which greatly entertains the tiger. Bosko and the tiger play patty cake, dance, and Bosko plays the tiger's whiskers and tail like guitar strings. Now that the tiger has been rendered thoroughly harmless, Bosko kicks it off a cliff. Bosko then spots two little monkeys playing leap frog. He picks one of them up, but the monkey spits in his eye. Bosko begins spanking the monkey's behind, until he notices the monkey's father looming above him. Acting nonchalant, Bosko offers the ape some chewing gum. The ape accepts, and seems to enjoy the gum very much. They both stretch the gum out of their mouths and begin plucking a tune. The rest of the jungle animals join in: monkeys, ostriches, kangaroos, and more. They play music on themselves, on each other, or with the jungle scenery. A kangaroo plays a tree, monkeys play a giraffe, and an elephant plays its trunk. A tree does a provocative fanny-slapping dance, gyrating its coconut bosoms, until one flies off and hits Bosko in the head. Bosko and three hyenas laugh.

Credits 
 Supervision by Hugh Harman and Rudolf Ising
 Musical Score by Frank Marsales
 Animated by Max Maxwell and Paul Smith

Cast 
Carman Maxwell: Bosko

Song 
"When the Little Red Roses Get the Blues for You" arr. Frank Marsales.

References

 Schneider, Steve (1990). That's All Folks!: The Art of Warner Bros. Animation. Henry Holt & Co.

External links
 
 
 

1930 short films
1930 animated films
1930s American animated films
1930s animated short films
Looney Tunes shorts
American black-and-white films
Animated films about music and musicians
Films about hunters
Films set in jungles
Films directed by Hugh Harman
Films directed by Rudolf Ising
Films set in Belgian Congo
Films set in the Democratic Republic of the Congo
Films set in the Republic of the Congo
Bosko films
Films scored by Frank Marsales
African-American animated films
Animated films about animals
1930s English-language films
American animated short films